Jonathan S. Feinstein (born 1960) is an American economist, currently the John G. Searle Professor at Yale School of Management. He is the author of The Nature of Creative Development (Stanford) 2006. His approach to creativity has been featured in Fast Company and Business Week.  He designed both the Innovator core course and the Math Camp pre-program for Yale. His math camp has been featured in the Wall Street Journal.

References

1960 births
Living people
Yale School of Management faculty
21st-century American economists
Place of birth missing (living people)